The fractional quantum Hall effect (FQHE) is a physical phenomenon in which the Hall conductance of 2-dimensional (2D) electrons shows precisely quantized plateaus at fractional values of . It is a property of a collective state in which electrons bind magnetic flux lines to make new quasiparticles, and excitations have a fractional elementary charge and possibly also fractional statistics. The 1998 Nobel Prize in Physics was awarded to Robert Laughlin, Horst Störmer, and Daniel Tsui "for their discovery of a new form of quantum fluid with fractionally charged excitations" Laughlin's explanation only applies to fillings  where  is an odd integer. The microscopic origin of the FQHE is a major research topic in condensed matter physics.

Introduction

The fractional quantum Hall effect (FQHE) is a collective behavior in a 2D system of electrons. In particular magnetic fields, the electron gas condenses into a remarkable liquid state, which is very delicate, requiring high quality material with a low carrier concentration, and extremely low temperatures. As in the integer quantum Hall effect, the Hall resistance undergoes certain quantum Hall transitions to form a series of plateaus. Each particular value of the magnetic field corresponds to a filling factor (the ratio of electrons to magnetic flux quanta)

where p and q are integers with no common factors. Here q turns out to be an odd number with the exception of two filling factors 5/2 and 7/2. The principal series of such fractions are

and

There were several major steps in the theory of the FQHE.

Laughlin states and fractionally-charged quasiparticles: this theory, proposed by Laughlin, is based on accurate trial wave functions for the ground state at fraction  as well as its quasiparticle and quasihole excitations. The excitations have fractional charge of magnitude .
A recent experiment seems to give a clear demonstration of this effect.
Hierarchy states: this theory was proposed by Duncan Haldane, and further clarified by Halperin, to explain the observed filling fractions not occurring at the Laughlin states' . Starting with the Laughlin states, new states at different fillings can be formed by condensing quasiparticles into their own Laughlin states. The new states and their fillings are constrained by the fractional statistics of the quasiparticles, producing e.g.  and  states from the Laughlin  state. Similarly constructing another set of new states by condensing quasiparticles of the first set of new states, and so on, produces a hierarchy of states covering all the odd-denominator filling fractions. This idea has been validated quantitatively, and brings out the observed fractions in a natural order. Laughlin's original plasma model was extended to the hierarchy states by MacDonald and others. Using methods introduced by Moore and Read, based on conformal field theory explicit wave functions can be constructed for all hierarchy states.
Composite fermions: this theory was proposed by Jain, and further extended by Halperin, Lee and Read. The basic idea of this theory is that as a result of the repulsive interactions, two (or, in general, an even number of) vortices are captured by each electron, forming integer-charged quasiparticles called composite fermions. The fractional states of the electrons are understood as the integer QHE of composite fermions. For example, this makes electrons at filling factors 1/3, 2/5, 3/7, etc. behave in the same way as at filling factor 1, 2, 3, etc. Composite fermions have been observed, and the theory has been verified by experiment and computer calculations.  Composite fermions are valid even beyond the fractional quantum Hall effect; for example, the filling factor 1/2 corresponds to zero magnetic field for composite fermions, resulting in their Fermi sea.

The FQHE was experimentally discovered in 1982 by Daniel Tsui and Horst Störmer, in experiments performed on gallium arsenide heterostructures developed by Arthur Gossard.  Tsui, Störmer, and Laughlin were awarded the 1998 Nobel Prize for their work.

Fractionally charged quasiparticles are neither bosons nor fermions and exhibit anyonic statistics.  The fractional quantum Hall effect continues to be influential in theories about topological order.  Certain fractional quantum Hall phases appear to have the right properties for building a topological quantum computer.

Evidence for fractionally-charged quasiparticles 

Experiments have reported results that specifically support the understanding that there are fractionally-charged quasiparticles in an electron gas under FQHE conditions.

In 1995, the fractional charge of Laughlin quasiparticles was measured directly in a quantum antidot electrometer at Stony Brook University, New York. In 1997, two groups of physicists at the Weizmann Institute of Science in Rehovot, Israel, and at the Commissariat à l'énergie atomique laboratory near Paris, detected such quasiparticles carrying an electric current, through measuring quantum shot noise
Both of these experiments have been confirmed with certainty.

A more recent experiment, which measures the quasiparticle charge extremely directly, appears beyond reproach.

Impact of fractional quantum Hall effect 

The FQH effect shows the limits of Landau's symmetry breaking theory. Previously it was long believed that the symmetry breaking theory could explain all the important concepts and  essential properties of all forms of matter. According to this view the only thing to be done is to apply the symmetry breaking theory to all different kinds of phases and phase transitions.
From this perspective, we can understand the importance of the FQHE discovered by
Tsui, Stormer, and Gossard.

The existence of FQH liquids indicates that there is a whole
new world beyond the paradigm of symmetry breaking, waiting to be explored.  
The FQH effect opened up a new chapter in condensed matter physics.
Different FQH states all have the same symmetry
and cannot be described by symmetry breaking theory.
The associated fractional charge, fractional statistics, non-Abelian statistics,
chiral edge states, etc. demonstrate the power and the fascination of emergence in many-body systems.
Thus FQH states represent new states of matter that contain a
completely new kind of order—topological order.
For example, properties once deemed isotropic for all materials may be anisotropic in 2D planes.
The new type of orders represented by FQH states greatly enrich our
understanding of quantum phases and quantum phase transitions.

See also 
 Hall probe
 Laughlin wavefunction
 Macroscopic quantum phenomena
 Quantum anomalous Hall effect
 Quantum Hall Effect
 Quantum spin Hall effect
 Topological order

Notes

References
 
 
 

Hall effect
Correlated electrons
Quantum phases
Mesoscopic physics
Unsolved problems in physics
Unexplained phenomena